is a railway station in the city of Ueda, Nagano, Japan, operated by the private railway operating company Ueda Electric Railway.

Lines
Yagisawa Station is served by the Bessho Line and is 10.1 kilometers from the terminus of the line at Ueda Station.

Station layout
The station consists of one ground-level side platforms serving a single bi-directional track. The station is not attended.

History
The station opened on 17 June 1921.

Station numbering was introduced in August 2016 with Yagisawa being assigned station number BE14.

Passenger statistics
In fiscal 2015, the station was used by an average of 33 passengers daily (boarding passengers only).

Surrounding area
Shioda Nishi Elementary School

See also
 List of railway stations in Japan

References

External links

 

Railway stations in Japan opened in 1921
Railway stations in Nagano Prefecture
Ueda Electric Railway
Ueda, Nagano